Palia is a village in the Punjab province of Pakistan. It is located at 30° 12' 15N 70° 8' 48E with an altitude of 1056 metres (3467 feet).

References

Villages in Punjab, Pakistan